The Ethnographic Museum of Berat is an ethnographic museum located in Berat, Albania. It opened in 1979 and contains a diversity of everyday objects from throughout Berat's history. The museum contains original furniture and a number of household objects, wooden case, wall-closets, as well as chimneys and a well. Near the well is an olive press, wool press and many large ceramic dishes, revealing a glimpse of the historical domestic culture of Berat's citizens. The ground floor has a hall with a model of a medieval street with traditional shops on both sides and on the second floor is an archive, loom, village sitting room, kitchen and sitting room.

References

E
Berat
Museums established in 1979
Tourist attractions in Berat
1979 establishments in Albania
Buildings and structures in Berat
Museums in Berat